Nabila Imloul (born 11 December 1982) is an Algerian former footballer who played as a forward. She has been a member of the Algeria women's national team.

Club career
Imloul has played for Evasion Bejaia, ASE Alger Centre and FC Bejaia in Algeria.

International career
Imloul capped for Algeria at senior level during two Africa Women Cup of Nations editions (2006 and 2010).

References

1982 births
Living people
Footballers from Béjaïa
Algerian women's footballers
Women's association football forwards
Algeria women's international footballers
21st-century Algerian people